Yang Liu (born 20 May 1992) is a Chinese boxer.

She won a medal at the 2019 AIBA Women's World Boxing Championships.

References

1992 births
Living people
AIBA Women's World Boxing Championships medalists
Chinese women boxers
Welterweight boxers